"Last to Know" is a song by Human Nature, released as the second single from their album second studio album Counting Down (1999). The song peaked at No. 14 in Australia and was certified Gold.

Track listing
CD single (666927.2)
 "Last To Know" – 4:29
 "She's Taken My Words" – 6:06
 "Ride Away" – 5:11

CD Maxi
 "Last To Know" – 4:29
 "She's Taken My Words" – 6:06
 "Ride Away" – 5:11
 "Last To Know" (Radio Remix) – 4:05
 "Last To Know" (VV Radio Edit) – 3:36
 "Last To Know" (VV Club Remix) – 6:42

Charts

Weekly charts

Year-end charts

Sales and certifications

References

1999 singles
Human Nature (band) songs
1998 songs
Sony Music Australia singles
Songs written by Steve Kipner
Songs written by Dane Deviller
Songs written by Sean Hosein
Synth-pop ballads